Events in the year 1845 in Belgium.

Incumbents
Monarch: Leopold I
Prime Minister: Jean-Baptiste Nothomb (to 30 July); Sylvain Van de Weyer (from 30 July)

Events

 10 June – partial legislative election
 16 September – Parliament meets in extraordinary session to debate responses to the failure of the potato crop
 10 November – Commercial treaty with the United States signed by Thomas Green Clemson and Adolphe Deschamps in Brussels.

Publications
Periodicals
 Almanach de poche de Bruxelles (Brussels, M. E. Rampelbergh)
 Almanach royal de Belgique (Brussels, Librairie Polytechnique)
 Annales de la Société royale des beaux-arts et de littérature de Gand
 Annales parlementaires de Belgique, part 1, part 2.
 Le bibliophile belge begins publication.
 Bulletin de l'Académie royale de médecine de Belgique, vol. 4
 Compte-rendu des séances de la commission royale d'histoire, vols. 9 and 10
 Journal de l'Instruction publique begins publication.
 Messager des sciences historiques (Ghent, Léonard Hebbelynck)
 Nouvelle Revue de Bruxelles
La renaissance: Chronique des arts et de la littérature, 6.

Studies and reports
 Désiré Arnould, Situation administrative et financière des monts-de-piété en Belgique (Brussels, Imprimerie du Moniteur Belge)
 Giovanni Arrivabene, Sur la condition des laboureurs et des ouvriers belges (Brussels, Meline, Cans & co.)
 Adolphe Jullien, Notes diverses sur les chemins de fer: en Angleterre, en Belgique et en France (Paris, Carilian-Goeury & V. Dalmont)

Others
 Les Belges illustres, vol. 3
 Hendrik Conscience, De Geschiedenis van België (Antwerp, J.-E. Buschmann, and Brussels, Alex Jamar).
 Lieven Everwyn, Korte levensschets van Jacob Van Artevelde (Ghent)
 Guillaume Tell Poussin, La Belgique et les Belges depuis 1830 (Paris, W. Couquebert)

Births
 24 January – Albert Desenfans, sculptor (died 1938)
 27 January – Karel Ooms, painter (died 1900)
 9 February – Henri Gondry, colonial administrator (died 1889)
 25 February – Eugène Goossens, père, conductor (died 1906)
 5 March – Alphonse Hasselmans, composer (died 1912)
 13 June – Alphonse-Jules Wauters, writer and editor (died 1916)
 24 June – Georges Nagelmackers, engineer and entrepreneur (died 1905)
 9 August – Xavier Mellery, painter (died 1921)
 17 November – Princess Marie of Hohenzollern-Sigmaringen, mother of Albert I of Belgium (died 1912)
 2 December – Évariste Carpentier, painter (died 1922)

Deaths
 3 January – Philippus Jacobus Brepols (born 1778), entrepreneur
 23 March – Dominique II Berger (born 1780), carillonneur
 20 July – Alexandre Artôt (born 1815), violinist

References

 
1840s in Belgium
Belgium